Jean Sainte-Fare Garnot (26 July 1908 – 20 June 1963) was a French Egyptologist. He was director of the Institut français d'archéologie orientale from 1953 to 1959, professor in Sorbonne, director of studies at the École pratique des hautes études, president of the French society of Egyptology and correspondent of the Académie des Inscriptions et Belles-Lettres.

He was the father of Nicolas Sainte-Fare Garnot, conservative of the Musée Jacquemart-André from 1993 till 2015, and the grandfather of Florent Sainte-Fare Garnot, mayor of Nevers from 2010 till 2014.

References

External links
 Fichier d'autorité international virtuel
 Bibliothèque nationale de France
 Système universitaire de documentation

French archaeologists
French Egyptologists
1908 births
1963 deaths
20th-century archaeologists
Members of the Institut Français d'Archéologie Orientale